Anupama is a Hindu feminine given name. In Sanskrit, it means "incomparable", or "excellent".

Notable people named Anupama 
 Anupama Aura Gurung (born 1988), Nepalese model and winner of the 2011 Miss Nepal Earth pageant
 Anupama Bhagwat (born 1974), Indian sitar player
 Anupama Chopra (born 1967), Indian writer, journalist and film critic
 Anupama Deshpande (born 1953), Indian playback singer, recipient of Filmfare Awards
 Anupama Gokhale (born 1969), Indian chess player
 Anupama Kumar (born 1974), Indian actress, model, journalist, anchor, visualizer and producer
 Anupama Mukti, Bangladeshi playback singer, recipient of Bachsas Awards
 Anupama Niranjana (1934 – 1991), Indian doctor and writer
 Anupama Raag, Indian singer and music director 
 Anupama Verma (born 1965), Indian actress, model and television personality
Anupama Parameswaran (born 1996), Indian actress, model and singer
 Annupamaa (born 1968), Indian playback singer
Anupama Watch Online Indian Desi Serial Favorite
All Episodes Watch Online
Imlie
Anandiba Aur Emily

References

Hindu given names
Indian feminine given names